Jordan S. Carolan Hyland (born 3 October 1989) is a former New Zealand rugby union player who played for  in the Bunnings NPC competition. His position of choice was wing.

References 

1989 births
Living people
Blues (Super Rugby) players
Highlanders (rugby union) players
Māori All Blacks players
New Zealand Māori rugby union players
New Zealand sportspeople of Samoan descent
New Zealand rugby union players
Northland rugby union players
Rugby union centres
Rugby union fullbacks
Rugby union players from Auckland
Rugby union wings